The Lufkin Foresters were a minor league baseball team based in Lufkin, Texas that played in the East Texas League in 1946 and in the Lone Star League in 1947 and 1948.

Year-by-year record

References

Lufkin, Texas
Baseball teams established in 1946
1946 establishments in Texas
Defunct minor league baseball teams
Defunct baseball teams in Texas
Professional baseball teams in Texas
Baseball teams disestablished in 1948
East Texas League teams